Dushara Vijayan is an Indian actress who has appeared in Tamil language films. After making her debut in the Tamil film Bodhai Yeri Budhi Maari (2019), she has been in films including Sarpatta Parambarai (2021) and Anbulla Ghilli (2022).

Career
Born in Dindigul, Dushara initially pursued an engineering degree, before discontinuing and taking fashion studies. She made her acting debut in Bodhai Yeri Budhi Maari (2019), a film made by newcomers, before working on Anbulla Ghilli (2022), a film based on a dog.

Dushara's breakthrough came through the sports drama Sarpatta Parambarai (2021), where she portrayed a feisty woman from 1970s Madras. She was selected for the film after director Pa. Ranjith had seen a photograph of her on Twitter and called her for a twenty-minute audition. Despite initially being unconvinced, Ranjith later chose to select her for the role. To prepare for the film, she learnt North Chennai dialect and picked up specific patterns of behaviour. The film opened to positive reviews, with Dushara's performance winning acclaim.

Dushara was seen in Pa. Ranjith's romantic drama Natchathiram Nagargiradhu (2022) and will be seen in Vasanthabalan's thriller Aneethi opposite Arjun Das.

Filmography

References

External links 
 

Indian film actresses
Tamil actresses
Living people
Actresses in Tamil cinema
21st-century Indian actresses
1997 births